Chunlimón is a Maya archaeological site in the Mexican state of Campeche. It is located 20 kilometers east from Kankabchen in Hopelchén Municipality.

References

Former populated places in Mexico
Maya sites in Campeche